Kamiichikawa Dam is a gravity dam located in Toyama prefecture in Japan. The dam is used for flood control and power production. The catchment area of the dam is 44.7 km2. The dam impounds about 21  ha of land when full and can store 4850 thousand cubic meters of water. The construction of the dam was started on 1959 and completed in 1964.

References

Dams in Toyama Prefecture
1964 establishments in Japan